Eupithecia cretaceata is a moth in the  family Geometridae. It is widely distributed in Canada and much of the United States. In Europe, it is found in France, Switzerland, Austria and parts of the Balkan Peninsula.

The wingspan is about 26 mm. Adults are chalky white with brownish blotches along the costa. There are dotted cross lines on the forewings. The adults are on wing from June to September in North America.

The larvae feed on the flowers and seeds of Veratrum viride in North America and Veratrum album in Europe.

Subspecies
Eupithecia cretaceata cretaceata (North America)
Eupithecia cretaceata fenestrata Millière, 1874 (Europe)

References

External links
Lepiforum.de

Moths described in 1874
cretaceata
Moths of Europe
Moths of North America
Taxa named by Alpheus Spring Packard